Phyllodytes amadoi is a frog in the family Hylidae, endemic to  Brazil.  It lives in the Atlantic rainforest.  Scientists know it exclusively from the type locality, which is in Bahia, but its range is likely to be much wider.

This frog is small for a species in Phyllodytes.  The adult frog measures 15.6-23.0 mm in snout-vent length.

References

amadoi
Endemic fauna of Brazil
Amphibians described in 2017